Pas Band or Pasband may refer to:
 Pas Band, Fars
 Pas Band, Hormozgan